West Hill is a prominent hill,  high, just to the west of the village of Evershot in the county of Dorset in southern England. Its prominence of  means it is listed as one of the Tumps. It is located within the Dorset Downs.

The summit is relatively flat and open. A public footpath runs past the summit to the south and there is a lane called Horsey Knap that crosses the northern flank of the hill and descends into Evershot.

References 

Hills of Dorset